Chonospeira is a monotypic genus of sea snail, a marine gastropod mollusk in the family Solariellidae. Its sole accepted species is Chonospeira nuda, common name the naked solarelle.

Description
The height of the shell attains 15 mm, its diameter 19 mm. The smooth, polished shell has a turbinate shape. The four whorls contain a few obscure spiral markings which do not interrupt the surface. This lack of ornament is remarkable. The color of the shell is white, with a pink or blue nacre glowing through. The whorls are rounded, flattened in front of the suture. The base of the shell is rounded. The wide umbilicus is funicular. The rounded aperture is oblique, hardly angulate by the umbilical rib, and with a very short interruption between the inner and outer lips. The thin, pale yellow operculum is light brown and has about ten whorls.

Distribution
This species occurs in the Pacific Ocean off California, USA to Baja California, Mexico

References

External links
 To Biodiversity Heritage Library (11 publications)
 To Encyclopedia of Life
 To USNM Invertebrate Zoology Mollusca Collection
 To ITIS
 To World Register of Marine Species
 

Solariellidae
Gastropods described in 1896